Kumari Bank Limited is one of the leading commercial banks in Nepal.
Its head office is located in Tangal, Kathmandu. The current CEO of Kumari Bank Limited is Mr. Ramesh Raj Aryal.

Kumari Bank Limited came into existence as the fifteenth commercial banks of Nepal, starting its banking operations from Chaitra 21, 2057 B.S (April 3, 2001) with an objective of providing competitive modern banking services in the Nepalese financial market. The Bank has a paid-up capital of NPR 26.23 billion.

Kumari Bank Limited provides a wide-range of modern banking services through 415 points of representation located in various urban, semi-urban and rural parts of the country, with 304 branches, 49 extension counters and 62 Branchless Banking Units.

The Bank has pioneered in providing modern banking services like Internet Banking and Mobile Banking. With the implementation of Core Banking Software, FINACLE (version 10), the Bank is confident that it will provide a robust, ultra-modern banking platform for all customers throughout the country.

The Bank has been offering both Domestic and International Visa Debit and Credit Card, accessible in all VISA linked ATMs in Nepal and India. It serves through 294 ATMs and over 1,200 POS terminals across the country. Along with this, the Bank offers latest digital banking services such as Mobile, Internet, and Viber Banking and QR payments. The Bank is recognized as an innovative and fast-growing institution that always strives towards customer satisfaction. It has transparent business practices, professional management, corporate governance, and Total Quality Management as the organizational mission.

See also
List of banks in Nepal
Nepal Stock Exchange
Nepal Rastra Bank

References

External links
Kumari Bank Limited Official Website
Kumari Bank Limited Management Team
Kumari Bank Limited Notices
Kumari Bank Limited Branch Locations
Kumari Bank Limited Online Account Opening

Banks of Nepal
Banks established in 2001
2001 establishments in Nepal